The portrait of Don Philip of Bourbon Family is an oil painting on canvas ( 285x415 cm ) of Giuseppe Baldrighi, dated to about 1757 and preserved in the Galleria Nazionale Di Parma.

References

Famiglia di Don Filippo di Borbone (see Italian page) (req. pre-2016-03-02) - by Giuseppe Baldrighi

Sources
  
 

1750s paintings